Volksdorf is a rapid transit station on the Hamburg U-Bahn line U1. Volksdorf is the last station on the U1's main line, and branch-off station for the U1's Ohlstedt and Großhansdorf branches. The station is located in the Hamburg suburb of Volksdorf, Germany. Volksdorf is part of the Hamburg borough of Wandsbek.

History 
At the time the station was opened in 1918, Volksdorf was an exclave of the Free and Hanseatic City of Hamburg. Back then, Volksdorf station was part of the Walddörferbahn. In February 1925 the station was electrified and integrated into the Hochbahn (U-Bahn) system.

Layout 
The elevated station is located on the western side of Claus-Ferck-Straße; the station's main entrance is located at the junction of Claus-Ferck-Straße and Farmsenser Landstraße. The station hall above the entrance consists of one island platform, one side platform and three rail tracks. The concrete beam station hall was built in 1920. Volksdorf station was renovated in 1957 and again between 1997 and 2001. Since 2001 the station is handicap-accessible.

Service

Trains 
Volksdorf is served by Hamburg U-Bahn line U1; departures into the inner-city are every 10 minutes, during rush hour every 5 minutes; departures to both Ohlstedt and Großhansdorf are exactly half as frequent. The travel time to Hamburg Hauptbahnhof takes about 29 minutes.

Gallery

See also 

 List of Hamburg U-Bahn stations

References

External links 

 Line and route network plans by hvv.de 
 100 Jahre Hochbahn by hochbahn.de 

Hamburg U-Bahn stations in Hamburg
Buildings and structures in Wandsbek
U1 (Hamburg U-Bahn) stations
Railway stations in Germany opened in 1918